Coate may refer to two places in the United Kingdom:

 Coate, Swindon – a former hamlet, now part of Swindon, England
 Coate, Wiltshire – a village in Bishops Cannings parish, Wiltshire, England

See also 
Coates (disambiguation)